Robert Whelan may refer to:

 Robert E. Whelan, retired justice of the Supreme Court of New York 
 Robert Louis Whelan (1912–2001), bishop in the Catholic Church in the United States